Rémi Casty (born 5 February 1985) is a former French international professional rugby league footballer and current assistant coach for Toulouse Olympique in the Super League. 

He played for the Sydney Roosters in 2014 before returning to Catalans.

Background
Casty was born in Narbonne, Languedoc-Roussillon, France.

Playing career

Catalans Dragons
From being considered something of a fringe player during the Dragons first two seasons in the Super League, Casty matured and became an integral part of the French team, and regularly seen making hard yards from the interchange bench.

Casty enjoyed an excellent season in 2012 which culminated in him being named in the Super League Dream Team.

Sydney Roosters
Casty left Catalans to join Sydney Roosters in 2014, and made his debut for the club in the 2014 World Club Challenge. In Round 11 of the 2014 NRL season, Casty made his NRL debut for the Roosters against the Canterbury-Bankstown Bulldogs. He went on to make 11 further NRL appearances, scoring two tries before rejoining Catalans at the start of the 2015 season.

Catalans Dragons (rejoin)
He played in the 2018 Challenge Cup Final victory over the Warrington Wolves at Wembley Stadium.

Toulouse Olympique
On 22 January 2021, it was reported that he had signed for Toulouse Olympique in the RFL Championship Casty retired at the end of the 2021 season having helped Toulouse secure promotion to Super League. He has joined on as assistant head coach for the 2022 season.

International career
He was a member of the France squad for the 2013 Rugby League World Cup and appeared in all four of France's matches at the tournament.

He was named in the France squad for the 2008 Rugby League World Cup. On 3 November 2011, the annual RLIF Awards dinner was held at the Tower of London where Casty was named the French player of the year.

In October 2016, Casty captained France in their end of year test match against England in Avignon. France lost the match 6-40.

References

External links

Catalans Dragons profile
France profile
SL profile

1985 births
Living people
Catalans Dragons captains
Catalans Dragons players
France national rugby league team captains
France national rugby league team players
French rugby league players
Rugby league props
Sydney Roosters players
Toulouse Olympique captains
Toulouse Olympique players